The 2022 United States Senate election in Pennsylvania was held on November 8, 2022, to elect a member of the United States Senate to represent the Commonwealth of Pennsylvania. Democratic lieutenant governor John Fetterman won his first term in office, defeating Republican surgeon Mehmet Oz. Fetterman succeeded incumbent Republican senator Pat Toomey, who did not seek re-election after two terms. The election marked the only U.S. Senate seat to flip parties in the 2022 midterms.

In the May 17 primary, Fetterman won the Democratic nomination with 59% of the vote. Oz finished with a 0.1% difference ahead of businessman David McCormick in the Republican primary, triggering an automatic recount. McCormick conceded the nomination on June 3, making Oz the first Muslim candidate to be nominated by either major party for U.S. Senate.

The general election was among the most competitive of the 2022 midterms and characterized as highly contentious. Fetterman framed Oz as an elitist carpetbagger with a radical anti-abortion stance in the wake of Roe v. Wade being overturned, while Oz framed Fetterman as a socialist insufficiently committed to fighting crime. Fetterman's health was also a major issue due to him suffering a stroke days before his primary victory. Although Fetterman led most pre-election polls, concerns towards his health and a scrutinized debate performance helped Oz take a narrow lead before the election.

Despite Oz's lead in final polls, Fetterman won by a 5% margin, becoming the first Democrat elected to this seat since 1962, and providing Senate Democrats a net gain of one seat and their first outright majority since 2015. With Fetterman's victory, elected Democrats held both Pennsylvania Senate seats for the first time since 1947.

Republican primary

Campaign

Early campaign
In October 2020, incumbent Republican senator Pat Toomey decided not to run for re-election, stating that he wished to return to the private sector.

By October 2021, businessman Jeff Bartos, who had posted strong fund-raising totals, and veteran Sean Parnell, who had the endorsement of former President Donald Trump, emerged as the race's front-runners. However, Parnell's campaign faced a large scandal in November 2021, after his ex-wife, Laurie Snell, testified in court during a custody hearing for the couple's children that Parnell strangled and spit on her, abused their children, and told her to "go get an abortion." Even prior to these allegations doubts had arisen among Republicans regarding Parnell's fundraising ability, and it became widely assumed that he would suspend his campaign if he did not win custody of his children. On November 22, 2021, Snell was given custody of the children and Parnell subsequently suspended his campaign.

Entry of Oz and McCormick
On November 30, with Parnell out of the race, Mehmet Oz, a celebrity doctor and television personality, announced his candidacy. Oz's campaign entered an immediate controversy over whether Oz himself was a resident of Pennsylvania, as he had lived in Cliffside Park, New Jersey, for most of his life and had only registered to vote in Pennsylvania in October 2020. The January 2022 entrance of David McCormick, a businessman, into the race prompted attacks for McCormick's past detraction of Trump and criticism of "America First" economic policies from Oz allies. Super PACs allied to McCormick hit back with a spate of highly funded television advertisements, accusing Oz of being a "Hollywood liberal."

Republican straw polls in January 2022 indicated strong support for Bartos and political commentator Kathy Barnette among party activists as the campaign started to escalate. Bartos won the Republican State Committee Central Caucus's straw poll, placing first with 49 votes, while Barnette finished in second place with 30 votes. McCormick and Sands trailed at third and fourth place; and Oz and former Boxing Commissioner George Bochetto performed poorly, each receiving only one vote. Despite this, political commentators largely considered Oz and McCormick to be the frontrunners, with the other candidates trailing them.

The McCormick campaign targeted Oz's ties to Turkey and called on him to renounce his Turkish citizenship, accusing Oz of harboring dual loyalties. Oz later stated that if he were elected to the Senate, he would renounce his Turkish citizenship. Former President Trump endorsed Oz on April 10, citing the popularity of his television show and perceived appeal to female voters. Oz frequently highlighted this endorsement, it becoming one of his major talking points during the campaign.

Late campaign
Oz had been ahead of the other candidates in the polls since the start of his campaign, with McCormick soon rising quickly in the polls to challenge Oz, both men polling the low 20s. Barnette had also begun to rise in the polls at this point after a string of attention-getting debate performances and an ad spend in support of her by the Club for Growth, and her late surge prompted a change in tactics from the two frontrunners, who had largely ignored her as irrelevant until then. Pro-Oz Super PAC American Leadership Action launched an ad campaign accusing Barnette of supporting Black Lives Matter, while McCormick stated that Barnette was unelectable, citing her heavy loss in a U.S. House race the previous election cycle. Oz himself also accused Barnette of Islamophobia, pointing to a 2015 tweet in which she stated, "Pedophilia is a Cornerstone of Islam."

Candidates

Nominees
Mehmet Oz, host of The Dr. Oz Show and former cardiologist

Eliminated in primary
 Kathy Barnette, Armed Forces Reserves veteran, author, political commentator on Fox News, and nominee for PA-04 in 2020
 Jeff Bartos, businessman, philanthropist and nominee for Lieutenant Governor in 2018
 George Bochetto, Pennsylvania State Boxing Commissioner (1996–2002)
 Sean Gale, candidate for the Montgomery County Commission in 2019
 David McCormick, U.S. Under Secretary of the Treasury for International Affairs (2007–2009) and CEO of Bridgewater Associates (2020–2022)
 Carla Sands, U.S. Ambassador to Denmark (2017–2021)

Disqualified
 John Debellis, small business owner
 John Eichenberg, truck driver
 Robert Jeffries, perennial candidate
 Ron Johnson, U.S. Armed Forces veteran, former construction worker, and former Walmart manager (ran as the Constitution nominee)
 Richard Mulholland, HVAC technician
 Max Richardson
 Martin Rosenfeld, Elk County deputy sheriff and treasurer of the Elk County Republican Party
 David Xu, U.S. Army veteran, college professor and IT business owner

Withdrew
 Craig Snyder, former chief of staff to U.S. Senator Arlen Specter

Declined
Kenneth Braithwaite, U.S. Secretary of the Navy (2020–2021), U.S. Ambassador to Norway (2018–2020), and former advisor to U.S. Senator Arlen Specter
 Mike Kelly, U.S. representative for PA-16; formerly  (2011–present) (endorsed Parnell)
 Paul Mango, deputy chief of staff for Policy at the U.S. Department of Health and Human Services (2019–2021), and candidate for governor in 2018
Kiron Skinner, Taube Professor of International Relations and Politics at Carnegie Mellon University and former Director of Policy Planning at the U.S. State Department (2018–2019)
Pat Toomey, incumbent U.S. senator
 Donald Trump Jr., businessman and son of former President Donald Trump (endorsed Parnell)

Debates and forums

Endorsements

Polling
Graphical summary

Results
Following the first night of results, it became clear that Oz and McCormick were the top two vote-getters in the election; however, the margin between them was too close to declare a victor. A mandatory recount then began. Former President Trump encouraged Oz to declare victory on election night, stating that Oz would only be defeated as a result of election fraud; these claims were noted by Politico as echoing Trump's baseless claims of election fraud in the 2020 presidential election. With McCormick having done better with mail-in ballots, Oz opposed counting ballots which were received by election offices before election day but were missing dates on the envelopes. A state court later required counties to count undated ballots as valid.

On June 3, McCormick conceded to Oz, saying he could not make up the deficit in the recount.

Democratic primary

Campaign
The first two major Democratic candidates were Lieutenant Governor of Pennsylvania John Fetterman and state representative Malcolm Kenyatta. Both Fetterman and Kenyatta were considered to be staunchly progressive Democrats, but the two men were felt to appeal to different demographics. By July 2021, Fetterman was considered the frontrunner as a result of his high name recognition and strong fundraising. U.S. Representative Conor Lamb, a political moderate, entered the race on August 6, 2021.

As the campaign progressed, Lamb and Fetterman became the two most prominent candidates, with Kenyatta and Montgomery County Commissioner Val Arkoosh also receiving media attention. Fetterman had maintained his frontrunner status as of December, and the other three contenders were viewed as mainly competing with each other in order to claim the anti-Fetterman mantle. On February 4, 2022, Arkoosh withdrew from the race, her campaign having previously suffered from poor poll results and low support from party activists, leaving Kenyatta as the only major candidate from the Philadelphia region. Both Kenyatta and Lamb were considered to have a good chance at picking up voters who had previously supported Arkoosh, Lamb for ideological reasons and Kenyatta for geographical ones.

In addition to Fetterman, Kenyatta, and Lamb, two minor candidates also made the Democratic primary ballot, namely Kevin Baumlin, a hospital physician, and Alexandra Khalil, a municipal official. Baumlin withdrew from the race on March 31, leaving only Khalil in addition to the three major candidates.

Lamb received the assistance of the “Penn Progress” Super PAC, which spent the entirety of its funds in support of Lamb's campaign. Lamb worked closely with the Super PAC, and participated in donor calls it arranged. The Penn Progress Super PAC bankrolled TV ads which sought to portray Fetterman as a "self-described democratic socialist." Within a day of airing, PolitiFact and Factcheck.org called the attack ad false, The Philadelphia Inquirer commented that Fetterman had never actually described himself that way, the ABC affiliate in Philadelphia stopped broadcasting the ad, and Senator Elizabeth Warren called on Lamb to disavow it.

Candidates

Nominee
 John Fetterman, Lieutenant Governor of Pennsylvania (2019–present), mayor of Braddock (2005–2019) and candidate for the U.S. Senate in 2016

Eliminated in primary
 Malcolm Kenyatta, state representative for the 181st district (2019–present)
 Alexandria Khalil, Jenkintown borough councillor (2019–present)

Disqualified
 Kael Dougherty, data operations associate
 Larry Johnson, attorney
 Alan Shank, retail worker
 Walter Sluzynsky, postal worker
 Lew Tapera, retail worker

Withdrew
 Val Arkoosh, member of the Montgomery County Board of Commissioners (2014–present) and physician
 Kevin Baumlin, chief of Emergency and Urgent Care Services at Pennsylvania Hospital
 John McGuigan, former president of the Norristown Municipal Council (1994–1997)
Eric Orts, professor at the Wharton School at the University of Pennsylvania (endorsed Kenyatta)
 Sharif Street, state senator for the 3rd district (2017–present), vice chair of the Pennsylvania Democratic Party, son of former Mayor of Philadelphia John Street (endorsed Lamb)

Declined
Madeleine Dean, U.S. representative for PA-04 (2019–present) (ran for re-election)
Jim Kenney, Mayor of Philadelphia (2016–present) (endorsed Lamb)
Josh Shapiro, Pennsylvania Attorney General (2017–present) (ran for Governor)
 Joe Torsella, Pennsylvania State Treasurer (2017–2021)

Debates

Endorsements

Polling
Graphical summary

Results
Fetterman won the Democratic primary by a landslide, winning all 67 counties in Pennsylvania, with Lamb in second place. Lamb's loss was attributed by Vanity Fair to numerous reasons, such as his not being known to voters in the Lehigh Valley region of eastern Pennsylvania, where the majority of Democratic voters were located, while in contrast Fetterman's position as Lieutenant Governor gave him statewide name recognition. In addition, the far more contested Republican primary had consumed media attention that Lamb might have otherwise used to gain more name recognition. Fetterman was also widely considered to have run an effective populist campaign, with The Atlantic noting that his campaign focused on the issues of "workers, wages and weed".

Libertarian convention

The Libertarian Party nominee qualified for the general election ballot on August 1.

Candidates

Nominee
Erik Gerhardt, carpenter, small business owner, and candidate for president in 2020

Withdrew
Steve Scheetz, powder coater and former chair of the Libertarian Party of Pennsylvania (2013–2015, 2019–2021)

Green convention
The Green Party nominee qualified for the general election ballot on August 1.

Candidates

Nominee
Richard L. Weiss, lawyer, nominee for attorney general in 2020, and nominee for judge of the Allegheny County Court of Common Pleas in 2021

Independents and other parties

Candidates

Qualified for ballot
Dan Wassmer (Keystone nominee), lawyer and Libertarian nominee for attorney general in 2020

Declared write-in
Ron Johnson (Constitution nominee), U.S. Armed Forces veteran, former construction worker, and former Walmart manager (originally ran as a Republican)
Quincy Magee, inspector of elections for Philadelphia's 44th ward

Withdrew

General election

Campaign
Fetterman's campaign framed Oz as a wealthy outsider who lived outside of Pennsylvania before 2020, including by airing ads that note his past residency in New Jersey. Fetterman also flew banners and published social media posts described by The Hill and The Washington Post as "trolling" his opponent. In one post, Fetterman started a petition to get Oz inducted to the New Jersey Hall of Fame. In response to the carpetbagging criticisms, Oz said during the primary debate that Pennsylvanians "care much more about what I stand for than where I'm from".

Oz's campaign criticized Fetterman for being inactive since he suffered a stroke in May and made an issue of Fetterman's health. In September, Oz published his medical records, which prompted Fetterman to state he was medically cleared to serve in the Senate. Oz's campaign also framed Fetterman as a socialist, highlighting his endorsement of Bernie Sanders in 2016. Fetterman countered that he has differences in policy proposals with Sanders in issues such as fracking.

Fetterman's refusal to debate Oz until late October was criticized by Oz's campaign. Fetterman attributed the delay in debating to lingering issues from his stroke and his team criticized debate concessions from Oz's team for allegedly mocking Fetterman's stroke recovery. A single debate was held on October 25.

Crudités video
On August 15, 2022, an April 2022 campaign video of Oz shopping in a Redner's Warehouse supermarket went viral. In the video, Oz says he is shopping for produce to make crudités and attributes the allegedly high prices to Democratic president Joe Biden.

The video was widely ridiculed on social media and was the subject of several news articles. Most observers focused on Oz's usage of the French term "crudités", his choice of items, and several factual errors; Fetterman himself replied saying that Pennsylvanians refer to crudités as "veggie trays". Oz's choice of a raw head of broccoli, asparagus, and multiple pounds of carrots, with guacamole and salsa, was described as "bizarre" by many. Others expressed confusion at Oz's statement that the $20 cost of the vegetables and dips "doesn't even include the tequila", as tequila is not a traditional accompaniment to crudités and liquor is not sold in grocery stores in Pennsylvania. Many observers noted Oz quoted the wrong price tag for the salsa and falsely suggested the broccoli was $2 per head when it was $2 per pound.

The number of internet searches for crudités dramatically increased in the aftermath of the video's circulation. Oz appearing to confuse the Redner's and Wegmans supermarket chains led to the name "Wegner's" trending on Twitter and a parody Twitter account called "Wegner's Groceries" gaining popularity. The Fetterman campaign sought to capitalize on the video by introducing merchandise referencing it. When asked if the video made him unrelatable to voters, Oz emphasized he helped others throughout his career and would continue to help if elected.

Debate
In the October 25 debate, a special arrangement of transcription monitors was put in place to assist Fetterman with his auditory processing issue. According to the Associated Press, Fetterman "struggled at times to explain his positions and often spoke haltingly", with Fetterman facing issues completing sentences and frequently pausing after questions were asked. Oz was described as being "more at home on the debate stage" and presented himself as a moderate Republican, and did not reference Fetterman's health condition. Independent health experts said that Fetterman was recovering "remarkably well". Fetterman particularly struggled answering a question regarding his previous opposition to fracking by stating he always supported fracking, while Oz answered a question on abortion by saying that the federal government should have no role in states' abortion decisions, instead leaving abortion decisions to "women, doctors, [and] local political leaders".

According to Politico and The Guardian, Fetterman "struggled" during the debate, and some Democrats questioned why he chose to debate at all. After the debate, the Fetterman campaign claimed that the closed captioning system provided by Nexstar Media Group gave incorrect and slow captions. Nexstar denied the claims, arguing the captioning "worked as expected" and that the Fetterman team had had the opportunity for two rehearsals with the equipment and opted to only do one.

Predictions

Debates

Endorsements

Polling
Aggregate polls 

Graphical summary

Jeff Bartos vs. John Fetterman

Jeff Bartos vs. Conor Lamb

Sean Parnell vs. John Fetterman

Sean Parnell vs. Conor Lamb

Results
Fetterman won the election by 4.9 percentage points, and was declared the winner in the early hours of November 9. The early victory came as a shock to many pundits, as the race was expected to take several days to project a winner. Oz underperformed former Republican president Donald Trump's performance in the 2020 United States presidential election in Pennsylvania by 3.7 percentage points, but overperformed Republican nominee Doug Mastriano in the concurrent gubernatorial race by 10 percentage points.

Counties that flipped from Republican to Democratic
 Bucks (largest municipality: Bensalem)
 Centre (largest municipality: State College)
 Chester (largest municipality: West Chester)
 Dauphin (largest municipality: Harrisburg)
 Erie (largest municipality: Erie)
 Northampton (largest municipality: Bethlehem)

Voter demographics 
Voter demographic data for 2022 was collected by CNN. The voter survey is based on exit polls completed by 2,660 voters in person as well as by phone.

See also
 2022 United States Senate elections

Notes

Partisan clients

References

External links

Official campaign websites
 John Fetterman (D) for Senate
 Erik Gerhardt (L) for Senate
 Ron Johnson (C) for Senate
 Quincy Magee (I) for Senate
 Mehmet Oz (R) for Senate
 Dan Wassmer (K) for Senate
 Richard L. Weiss (G) for Senate

2022
Pennsylvania
United States Senate
Islam in Pennsylvania